Kattowal, situated at the left bank of Jehlum River, is a small village in Malakwal subdivision of Mandi Bahauddin District in Pakistan.

References 

Villages in Mandi Bahauddin District